American Pie Presents: The Naked Mile is a 2006 American sex comedy film released by Universal Pictures. It is the second installment in the American Pie Presents film series, a spin-off of the American Pie franchise. John White stars as Erik Stifler, a high school senior given a hall pass from his girlfriend (Jessy Schram) who visits his cousin (Steve Talley) to run a mile naked. Christopher McDonald co-stars as Erik's father and Eugene Levy plays family friend Noah Levenstein. It was followed by Beta House (2007).

The Naked Mile was released direct-to-DVD internationally on December 12, 2006, and in the United States on December 19, 2006. The film was a financial success, generating US$27.46 million in United States sales.

Plot 
Erik Stifler, Steve and Matt Stifler's cousin, fails to live up to the family name as he is about to graduate from high school a virgin. As the film opens, Erik feigns an illness so that he can stay home and masturbate. His parents and grandmother unexpectedly walk in and are hit with Erik's semen, causing his grandmother to die of a heart attack.

Erik's girlfriend of two years, Tracy, loves him but is not ready for sex. She suddenly decides she's now ready, inviting Erik to her house later to have sex for the first time. They are interrupted when her father comes downstairs for a nightcap. Before Tracy's father can catch him, a naked Erik flees from the dryer, in which he defecated while hiding there.

Erik's friends Cooze and Ryan plan a road trip to visit Erik's cousin Dwight Stifler at the University of Michigan for an event known as the Naked Mile. Tracy sees this as an opportunity to give Erik a sex pass, hoping that he can quench his lustful desires.

As soon as Erik and his friends arrive on campus, they witness a drinking contest where Dwight is crowned champion. Later, they lose a rough game of football against a bitter rival fraternity composed almost entirely of midgets. Later at a bar, Erik meets a college girl named Brandi who has a fetish for virgins, prompting Ryan and Cooze to make a bet regarding whether or not Erik will sleep with her.

The following morning, Dwight gets attacked by the midget fraternity while walking down the street, landing him in the hospital. However, he manages to make it to the Naked Mile where he joins up with Erik, Ryan, and Cooze. At first they are reluctant to run, but when Brandi, Jill, and Alexis strip down stark naked, they are finally prompted to strip down as well. Finally as Erik and Brandi reach the finish line, they share a kiss which is caught on camera for a TV news report. Watching the report about the Naked Mile at home, Tracy is upset and feels guilty that she allowed Erik the pass. Her friends convince her to also lose her virginity before he gets back.

Later that evening, Erik realizes that he loves Tracy, so confesses to Brandi that he cannot sleep with her, and rushes back to see his girlfriend. When he gets to her house, Tracy's dad says she is at a party. Erik rides her horse to the party, pounds on the closed bedroom door and proclaims his love for her. However, Tracy is not in the room because she had decided that she could not go through with her plans. They reconcile and have sex.

When Erik returns to the Beta house to pick up his friends the next morning, each guy shares stories of his sexual experiences from the night before. The guys then ask him if he "sealed the deal" with Brandi that night, and when Erik tells them no, Ryan pays up on the bet to Cooze. Erik tells them about his adventure back home to make up with Tracy and finally lose his virginity. The guys are proud of him for officially living up to the Stifler family name, and the three friends go home.

During the post-Naked Mile party, Dwight spots Vicky, the girlfriend of the leader of the midget fraternity, Rock. She heads up to Dwight's room to have sex. Later, as the film closes, Dwight sends a DVD to Rock that reads, "Payback's a bitch." It reveals Dwight and Vicky having sex to Rock's dismay.

Cast 

 John White as Erik Stifler
 Steve Talley as Dwight Stifler
 Jessy Schram as Tracy Sterling
 Eugene Levy as Noah Levenstein 
 Ross Thomas as Ryan Grimm
 Jake Siegel as Mike "Cooze" Coozeman
 Christopher McDonald as Harry Stifler
 Jordan Prentice as Rock
 Maria Ricossa as Mrs. Stifler
 Candace Kroslak as Brandy
 Mika Winkler as Vicky
 Dan Petronijevic as Bull
 Jaclyn A. Smith as Jill
 Angelique Lewis as Alexis
 Jordan Madley as Brooke
 Melanie Merkosky as Natalie
 Jon Cor as Trent
 Alyssa Nicole Pallett as Porn Chick
 Jessica Booker as Grandma Stifler
 Stuart Clow as Mr. Sterling
 Joe Bostwick as Mr. Williams
 Daniel Morgret as Frankie

Production 

"The Naked Mile" of the title refers to a real event that was carried out annually by students of the University of Michigan that ran in earnest beginning in 1985 and ending in 2000 although smaller groups ran through 2004. The participants, mostly senior students, would run or bike a pre-designed course through campus while partially or entirely naked to celebrate the last day of class.  The city began the "Naked Mile" crackdown in 2000 after the University began issuing threats to students who ran and arresting some for indecent exposure. Participation in the event was also affected as a result of it attracting amateur videographers who sold videos of the event online.

Filming locations 
Parts were filmed at McMaster University in Hamilton, Ontario, and at the St. George campus of the University of Toronto in Toronto, Ontario.  The Naked Mile itself was filmed at Victoria College, a federated college within the University of Toronto. Other parts were filmed at Port Credit Secondary School in Mississauga, Ontario.

DVD sales 
The DVD was released on December 19, 2006 in the USA.  In the opening weekend, 478,336 units were sold, generating revenue of $9,561,937.   As of April 2010, over 3,000,000 have been sold translating to estimate amount of $30,000,000 in revenue. The Region 2 DVD was released in the UK on December 4, 2006 in PAL Widescreen and has been certified 15 by the BBFC with the following viewer guidance; Contains strong language, moderate sex and sex references. The movie was passed without any cuts.

The Region 1 DVD was released December 19, 2006 in Fullscreen R-Rated, Fullscreen Unrated, and Widescreen Unrated versions. All feature Dolby Digital 5.1 audio in English, French, and Spanish. Extras include deleted and extended scenes, outtakes, and a full-length feature commentary featuring the director, writer and cast members. The unrated DVD also contains two bonus features.

Reception
After the commercial success of the direct-to-DVD production American Pie Presents: Band Camp, Universal Studios Home Entertainment decided to produce another sequel to the American Pie film. American Pie Presents: The Naked Mile was released direct-to-video on December 19, 2006. The film was a financial success, generating US$27.41 million in DVD sales domestically.

The review aggregator website Rotten Tomatoes reported a 0% approval rating based on 5 reviews, and an average rating of 3.2/10. Tanner Stransky of Entertainment Weekly graded the film with a "C" and wrote "although predictable, the opening stays on par with Jason Biggs’ original jaw-dropper. The rest is pretty deadly." Film critic Christopher Null wrote "I never thought I'd believe that the characters in American Pie were rich and nuanced, but compared to the disjointed, half-written affair here, they may as well be from Shakespeare." IGNs Chris Carle gave the film 3/10, writing that it's "a smorgasbord of gross-out humor, shallow laughs and bigotry." Steve Weintraub of Collider wrote "there is something to be said about comedic timing and pacing to even the most basic form of cinematic genres, neither of which this [film] grasps at all." Common Sense Media's Heather Boerner gave the film 2/5, writing that it's "another raunchy race toward the first time." Writing in DVD Talk, Scott Weinberg criticised the acting, directing and screenplay, declaring that "The Naked Mile is one of the lamest, laziest and most shockingly amateurish comedies I've ever seen". Sloan Freer of The Radio Times gave the film 2/5, writing that "even fans of teen sex comedies will find the verbal gags repetitive, predictable and often plain unfunny, while the visual jokes are dragged out to tedious levels." DVD Verdict's Eric Profancik, in his positive review, found the film was "filled with a firm, rowdy, and lascivious wit that made you smirk with its aggressive antics", in particular praising the opening scene as "stunning". Peter Hammond of Maxim describes The Naked Mile as "hilarious, sexy fun... goes where no American Pie has gone before," writing that it "goes the extra mile for laughs and gets them".

See also

 Culture of Ann Arbor, Michigan

References

External links

 Official site  of the American Pie series.
 
 
 

2006 direct-to-video films
2006 films
Canadian sex comedy films
2000s English-language films
Direct-to-video sequel films
American Pie (film series)
Films about virginity
2000s teen sex comedy films
Films shot in Hamilton, Ontario
Rogue (company) films
Films about fraternities and sororities
American teen comedy films
American sex comedy films
Universal Pictures direct-to-video films
Films directed by Joe Nussbaum
Direct-to-video comedy films
Teen sex comedy films
English-language Canadian films
2000s American films
2000s Canadian films